Oiva Lommi (30 June 1922 – 23 July 2000) was a Finnish rower who competed in the 1948 Summer Olympics and in the 1952 Summer Olympics.

He was born in Vehkalahti and died in Kotka. He was the cousin of Veikko Lommi. In 1948 he was a crew member of the Finnish boat which was eliminated in the quarter-finals of the coxed four event. Four years later he won the bronze medal with the Finnish boat in the coxless four competition.

References

1922 births
2000 deaths
People from Hamina
Finnish male rowers
Olympic rowers of Finland
Rowers at the 1948 Summer Olympics
Rowers at the 1952 Summer Olympics
Olympic bronze medalists for Finland
Olympic medalists in rowing
Medalists at the 1952 Summer Olympics
Sportspeople from Kymenlaakso